Glycocaulis alkaliphilus is a  Gram-negative, aerobic and dimorphic bacterium from the genus of Glycocaulis which has been isolated from crude oil from the Daqing oilfield in China.

References 

Caulobacterales
Bacteria described in 2015